The District of New Mexico was a military district of the United States Army in the Territory of New Mexico that existed from 1865 to 1890.  The District of Arizona and the District of New Mexico replaced the Department of New Mexico from June 27, 1865.

The District of New Mexico was subordinate to the Military Division of the Pacific from June 27, 1865 - July 1866.  It was subordinate to the Department of the Missouri, from 1866 to 1890.

Commanders 
 Brigadier General, James Henry Carleton, June 27, 1865 - July 1866
 Lt. Colonel, James Henry Carleton, July 1866 - March 27, 1867 
 Lt. Colonel, George Sykes , March 27 to April 11, 1867,
 Lt. Colonel, George W. Getty, April 11, 1867 - January 11, 1871
 Colonel Gordon Granger, April 29, 1871 - June 1, 1873 
 ? , June 1, 1873 - October 31, 1875 
 Colonel Gordon Granger, October 31, 1875 - January 10, 1876
 Colonel Edward Hatch, January 10, 1876 - October 30, 1881
 Colonel Ranald Slidell Mackenzie, October 30, 1881 - November 22, 1882, 
 Colonel David Sloane Stanley, November 22, 1882 - February 21, 1883
 Brig. Gen. Ranald Slidell Mackenzie, February 21 to October 27, 1883
 Colonel David Sloane Stanley, October 27, 1883 - May 1, 1884
 ?, May 1, 1884 - November  6, 1884    
 Colonel Peter Tyler Swaine, November  6, 1884 - March 2, 1885 
 ?  , March 2, 1885 - November 26, 1888  
 Colonel Eugene Asa Carr, November 26, 1888 - Sept. 1, 1890.

Posts in the District of New Mexico
The following is a list of posts occupied by the U. S. Army and Union Army in the district at various times during the existence of the District of New Mexico.
 Post of Albuquerque (1846–1867), at Albuquerque
 Fort Marcy (1846–1867, 1875-1894), Santa Fe
 Camp Tecolate, (1850-1860, 1870?), Tecolote
 Fort Union (1851–1894), near Watrous
 Camp Magoffin (1854, 1863–1865), near Alto
 Fort Craig (1854–1885), 32 miles south of Socorro.
 Fort Stanton (1855–1896), near Capitan
 Fort Fauntleroy (1860-1861), Fort Lyon (1861-1862), Fort Wingate, (1868-1918), near Gallup
 Los Pinos Depot/Station, Camp at Peralta, or Camp Peralta (1862–1866), at Peralta
 Fort Sumner (1862–1869), at Fort Sumner
 Fort Wingate, or Fort El Gallo, (1862–1868), San Rafael
 Fort Bascom (1863–1870), 10 miles north of Tucumcari.  
 Fort Cummings (1863–1873), Camp at Fort Cummings (1880 - 1884) and (1886) at Cooke's Spring
 Fort McRae (1863–1876), below Ojo del Muerto in McRae Canyon, west of Engle
 Fort Selden (1865–1877), at Paraje de Robledo, now Radium Springs 
 Camp Lincoln (1865-1866), near Fort Union
 Fort Lowell (1866-1869), near Tierra Amarilla
 Camp at Baird's Ranch, (1866), near Albuquerque

References 

New Mexico, District of
New Mexico, District of
New Mexico, District of
New Mexico, District of